Mikele "Miki" Ronisse Barber (born October 4, 1980, in Livingston, New Jersey) is an American sprinter who won gold at the 4 x 100 meters relay event in 2007 World Championships in Athletics, in Osaka, Japan, and an individual gold medal at the 100 meters in 2007 Pan Am Games in Rio de Janeiro, Brazil.

She is the twin sister of Me'Lisa Barber, who has also won relay medals on the world stage.

References

External links 
 
 

1980 births
Living people
American female sprinters
People from Livingston, New Jersey
Sportspeople from Essex County, New Jersey
Athletes (track and field) at the 2007 Pan American Games
African-American female track and field athletes
American twins
Twin sportspeople
World Athletics Championships medalists
South Carolina Gamecocks women's track and field athletes
Track and field athletes from New Jersey
Pan American Games gold medalists for the United States
Pan American Games silver medalists for the United States
Pan American Games medalists in athletics (track and field)
Universiade medalists in athletics (track and field)
Universiade gold medalists for the United States
Universiade silver medalists for the United States
World Athletics Championships winners
Medalists at the 1999 Summer Universiade
Medalists at the 2001 Summer Universiade
Medalists at the 2007 Pan American Games
21st-century African-American sportspeople
21st-century African-American women
20th-century African-American people
20th-century African-American women